Thomas Mohan (born 1959) is a wildlife photographer and civil engineer. He has travelled around the world for his passion for photography.

Thomas Mohan is basically a civil engineer born and raised in Bangalore, India. Hailing from a photography family he started photography at the very young age with a Yashica box camera.

He is a Nikon Expertive/ Influencer, President - Pix4cause, Co- founder - Pro View and Managing Partner of Canaan group.

Thomas Mohan is a self learnt wildlife photographer and his photography weapons are Nikon D6, D850, D4s bodies and Lenses 600 f4, 400 f2.8, 300 f2.8, 70-200 f 2.8,24-70 f 2.8, 14-24 f2.8, 105 f2.8.

Awards
Muthukulam Raghavan Pillai Award, 2015
DCP Photographer of the year for 2015 and 2016
FIAP Biennial World Cup Gold Medalist

References

Nature photographers
Living people
21st-century photographers
1959 births